SARAF may refer to:
 SARAF (TMEM66), a gene that encodes the SARAF protein
 SARAF – Soreq Applied Research Accelerator Facility, a  particle accelerator facility in Israel
 South Armagh Republican Action Force, an alleged Irish republican paramilitary group
 Saraf Hospital, hospital in Kochi in Kerala, India
 
People
 Ashok Saraf, Indian film actor
 Devita Saraf, Indian businesswoman
 Irving Saraf, Polish-born American film producer-director
 Kali Charan Saraf, Indian politician
 Mulk Raj Saraf, Indian writer 
 Nivedita Joshi Saraf, Indian film actress
 Onnik Chifte-Saraf, Armenian journalist and writer
 Pandit Jia Lal Saraf, Sanskrit language scholar from India 
 Peter Saraf, American film producer
 Ram Piara Saraf, Indian politician    
 Rohit Saraf, Indian actor
 Shirish Saraf, Indian businessman

See also
 Shroff